Jochem Marotzke (born 27 November 1959) is a German physical oceanographer and climate scientist. He is the managing director of the Max Planck Institute for Meteorology in Hamburg.

Career
Marotzke was born in Nister and studied physics at the University of Bonn, the University of Copenhagen and the University of Kiel, and earned his PhD in physical oceanography in 1990. He worked at the Massachusetts Institute of Technology from 1990 to 1999, and became an assistant professor there in 1992 and an associate professor in 1997. From 1999 to 2003 he was professor of physical oceanography at the Southampton Oceanography Centre. In 2003 he became director at the Max Planck Institute for Meteorology and in 2006 he also became a professor of physical oceanography at the University of Hamburg. He was elected as a member of the German National Academy of Sciences Leopoldina in 2007.

References 

 
 

German oceanographers
Physical oceanographers
German climatologists
Massachusetts Institute of Technology faculty
Academic staff of the University of Hamburg
Members of the German Academy of Sciences Leopoldina
1959 births
Living people
Max Planck Institute directors